Burning Blue Soul is the debut album released by Matt Johnson in 1981. The album is commonly regarded as an accomplished debut, with a mix of guitar riffs, tape loops, experimental electronics and heavily filtered vocals.

The album was re-released in 1993 under Johnson's band's name, The The. Johnson requested that 4AD do this so that all his albums would be racked together in record stores.

Despite rumours to the contrary, all releases of Burning Blue Soul contain the same mix.

Track listing
All tracks composed by Matt Johnson

 "Red Cinders in the Sand" – 5:42
 "Song Without an Ending" – 4:35
 "Time (Again) for the Golden Sunset" – 3:51
 "Icing Up" – 7:36
 "(Like a) Sun Rising Through My Garden" – 5:01
 "Out of Control" – 2:01
 "Bugle Boy" – 2:27
 "Delirious" – 3:33
 "The River Flows East in Spring" – 3:33
 "Another Boy Drowning" – 5:53

Personnel 
 Matt Johnson – vocals, producer, instrumentation
 Ivo Watts-Russell – producer (tracks 2, 4–8, 10)
 B.C. Gilbert & G. Lewis – producers (tracks 3 & 9)
 B.C. Gilbert - guitar (track 9)
 Graham Lewis - "karate chop" piano (track 9)
 Pete Maben – producer (track 1)
 Andy Johnson – artwork, illustrations
 Neville Brody - original artwork
 Fiona Skinner -   design & layout, typography. Bespoke typeface – hand cut in lino.  Hand tinted photo. Inner sleeve & back cover design
 Darren Laws – original 1981 (psychedelic eye) cover photography;
 AJ Barrett – photography, portrait photography (1983 issue)
 Ian Pye – liner notes (1993 issue)
 Howie Weinberg – digital remastering (CD issue)

References

External links
Retrospective review for reissue

The The albums
1981 debut albums
4AD albums
Warner Records albums